Khlung is the southernmost district (amphoe) of Chanthaburi province, eastern Thailand.

Geography
Neighboring districts are (from the northwest clockwise) Laem Sing, Mueang Chanthaburi, Makham, Pong Nam Ron of Chanthaburi Province, Bo Rai, Khao Saming, and Laem Ngop of Trat province. To the southeast is the Gulf of Thailand.

Administration
The district is divided into 12 sub-districts (tambons), which are further subdivided into 90 villages (mubans). Khlung is a town (thesaban mueang) which covers tambon Khlung. There are a further 11 tambon administrative organizations (TAO).

External links
amphoe.com

Khlung